Walter Roberts may refer to:

 Walter Roberts (American football) (born 1942), former American football player
 Walter Roberts (diplomat) (1893–1978), British diplomat
 Walter Orr Roberts (1915–1990), American astronomer and atmospheric physicist
 Walter Roberts (writer) (1916–2014), American writer, lecturer, and former government official
 Walter Hugh Roberts (born 1858), Welsh international footballer
 Walter Adolphe Roberts, Jamaican born novelist, poet, and historian